Pankino is a rural locality (a village) in Chyobsarskoye Urban Settlement, Sheksninsky District, Vologda Oblast, Russia. The population was 2 as of 2002.

Geography 
Pankino is located 39 km east of Sheksna (the district's administrative centre) by road. Gerasimovo is the nearest rural locality.

References 

Rural localities in Sheksninsky District